Natasha Khan is a Pakistani singer, songwriter, composer, and audio engineer. She is also the first qualified female audio engineer from Pakistan. Natasha made her debut in Coke Studio. She appeared as a singer in Coke Studio (Pakistani TV program) in Season 9 and Season 10 as a singer and backing vocalist.

Life and career 
Natasha Khan was born in Islamabad and now is based in London. She graduated from SAE Institute and has been producing, mixing, and mastering a number of mainstream acts. Natasha started her career with her single Aag released in 2005. The song is available on streaming platform ReverbNation. After a long gap, she made her mainstream return with a debut in Coke Studio Season 9 with Faakhir and performed "Dil Kamla". She returned to Coke Studio Pakistan (season 10) as a backing vocalist and featured artist where she performed her second duet song "Yo Soch" with Ali Zafar. Natasha is also the recording engineer for the feature film Azaadi. Natasha has also featured in Paisa Phenk, a song by Tamaasha – band that appeared in Pepsi Battle of the Bands. Natasha Khan is also appearing in Kashan Admani's Acoustic Station. Natasha made an appearance as a backing vocalist in Acoustic Station in Nida Hussain's song Jee Loon.  

Natasha Khan is also a part of Kashan Admani's global collaboration featuring Grammy nominee Simon Phillips (drummer), Grammy Award winning Charlie Bisharat, Stuart Hamm, Roman Miroshnichenko, Lili Casely, Palash Sen, Luiza Prochet and musicians from different parts of the world. The song 'We Are One' also features Pakistani musicians including Farhad Humayun, Faakhir, Najam Sheraz, Raafay Israr, Omran Shafique, Natasha Baig, and more.

We Are One (Global Collaboration Song) 
Natasha Khan featured in We Are One (Global Collaboration Song) produced by Kashan Admani. The song features 40 musicians from all over the world coming together for a message of hope and togetherness.

Discography

OST 
 Dil Ki Lagi for Telefilm Karwat by Laila Leghari

Singles 
 Aag
 Zara Suniye Toh Feat. Mirage Band
 Pyar Hua Feat. Mirage Band
 Duur Rahay Ho – Reprise Version
 Aankhain Feat Kami Gee
 Mera Pyar – Tribute to Amir Zaki 
Shake My Soul – Shah Rule Feat. Natasha Khan

Coke Studio 
 The National Anthem of Pakistan – Coke Studio Pakistan (season 10)
 Aye Raah e Haq Ke Shaheedon – Coke Studio Pakistan (season 9)
 Dil Kamla
 Yo Soch

Acoustic Station 

 Jee Loon - Nida Hussain

Collaborations 

 We Are One (global collaboration song)

References

1984 births
Living people
Musicians from Islamabad
Pakistani women singer-songwriters
Pakistani audio engineers
Pakistani pop singers
Urdu-language singers
21st-century Pakistani women singers